Gilbert Lake is a British sound engineer. He was nominated for a British Academy Film Award in the category Best Sound for the film Mission: Impossible – Fallout. Lake was also nominated for three Cinema Audio Society Awards for the films District 9, Wonder Woman and A Shaun the Sheep Movie: Farmageddon. He won and was nominated from numerous awards ceremonies.

Selected filmography 
 Mission: Impossible – Fallout (2018; co-nominated with James Mather, Chris Munro and Mike Prestwood Smith)

References

External links 

Living people
Place of birth missing (living people)
Year of birth missing (living people)
American audio engineers
21st-century American engineers